Dolní Počernice is a municipal district (městská část) and cadastral area (katastrální území) in Prague. It is located in the eastern part of the city. As of 2008, there were 2,190 inhabitants living in Dolní Počernice.

The first written record of Dolní Počernice is from the 14th century. The village became part of Prague in 1974.

External links 
 Praha-Dolní Počernice - Official homepage

Districts of Prague